Grace Matriculation Higher Secondary School is located in Arunachala Nagar, Porur, Tamil Nadu.

History
Grace Matriculation Higher secondary school was started in 1989. It was started by Mr. Samraj who is also the correspondent of the school. Mrs Elizabeth Samraj is Principal of the school.

References 

High schools and secondary schools in Tamil Nadu
Education in Tiruvallur district
Educational institutions established in 1989
1989 establishments in Tamil Nadu